Aa denticulata is a species of orchid in the genus Aa. It is found in Colombia and Ecuador. It blooms in the winter.

References

denticulata
Plants described in 1920